This is the 102nd season of Bolivian Football Regional Leagues, also known as Primera A. 

In 2010 the team that was promoted to 1st division was Nacional Potosi from Potosi, after winning the 2010 Copa Simón Bolívar.  They returned to La Liga one year after being relegated in the 2009 season. It started on 6 February 2010. The draw for the qualified team for Nacional B took place on May 4.

Santa Cruz

Primera A

Primera B

Oruro

Primera A

Litoral de Oruro

References

Reg